is a 2019 Japanese anime television series created by Kunihiko Ikuhara and jointly produced by MAPPA and Lapin Track. The series aired on Fuji TV's Noitamina programming block from April 11 to June 20, 2019 for eleven episodes, and follows three middle school students who are transformed into kappas in order to collect shirikodama, mythical balls located in the anus that contains the physical manifestation of one's desires; Ikuhara broadly developed the series as a story about yōkai (supernatural monsters) for an adult audience.

In English-language markets, Sarazanmai is syndicated by Crunchyroll, which simulcast the series during its original broadcast run; a dubbed version of the series was produced by Funimation. The series was praised by critics for the quality of its animation and its thematic richness, notably its focus on anti-capitalism and materialism, but was criticized for its compressed storytelling. Sarazanmai spawned a range of spin-off and adapted media both prior and subsequent to its release, including a serialized manga series, a manga anthology, a dramatized Twitter account, two light novels, a radio series, and a stage play.

Synopsis
After accidentally breaking a statue of a kappa that serves as the guardian god of the district of Asakusa, middle school students Kazuki, Toi, and Enta are transformed into kappas by Keppi, the prince of the Kappa Kingdom. They come to assist Keppi in collecting the Dishes of Hope, which fulfill the wishes of whoever possesses them. Dishes are acquired by collecting the shirikodama of zombies created by Reo and Mabu, agents of the Otter Empire. The Otter Empire, in the guise of "Kappazon, Inc.", controls society by manipulating the desires of the masses, and has been the enemy of the Kappa Kingdom for generations. To defeat the zombies, the boys must say the phrase "Sarazanmai", which can only be produced when the three are united. They struggle to connect, as each time the sound is made, one of the boys' secrets is revealed.

Characters

Main characters

A second year middle school student who is transformed into a kappa alongside Toi and Enta. He formerly played soccer with Enta, where they were known as the "golden duo", though he quit the sport immediately prior to the events of the series. He also cross dresses as the idol Sara Azuma to take selfies for his brother Haruka.

A delinquent middle school student who is transformed into a kappa alongside Kazuki and Enta. A recent transfer student in Kazuki's class, he sells cannabis for his brother Chikai.

Kazuki's childhood friend and classmate who is transformed into a kappa alongside Kazuki and Toi. Harbors a secret crush on Kazuki.

Yōkai

A kappa who is the prince of the Kappa Kingdom. Prior to the events of the series, the trauma of the Kappa Kingdom being defeated by the Otter Empire caused his shirikodama to split in two. The half containing his despair became Dark Keppi, a weapon of darkness controlled by the Otter Empire. Keppi maintained his other half, but was reduced to a chibi-style physical form, and was sealed in a statue in Kappabashi-dori before being awoken by Kazuki and Toi.

 A policeman who works in a kōban with Mabu, his partner and lover. He is a kappa who once served as a knight to Keppi, but now extracts the desires of humans on behalf of the Otter Empire after Otter resurrected Mabu. He wishes to use the Dishes of Hope to restore Mabu to his former self, who Reo believes is now merely a re-animated facsimile. In the spin-off manga, he is the adoptive father to Sara.

 A policeman who works in a kōban with Reo, his partner and lover. He is a kappa who once served as a knight to Keppi, but now extracts the desires of humans on behalf of the Otter Empire after being resurrected by Otter. Mabu was implanted with a mechanical heart by Otter after sacrificing himself to protect Reo, and now behaves in a cold and detached manner. Though Reo believes this is due to Mabu having to have lost his soul and personality after being resurrected, in reality, Mabu was forced to never again verbalize his love for Reo in exchange for his life. In the spin-off manga, he is the adoptive father to Sara.

Introduced as an idol and host of Asakusa Sara TV, Sara is actually a kappa, as well Keppi's love interest and princess. Similarly to the Shadow Players of Revolutionary Girl Utena and Double H of Penguindrum, Sara functions as the series' Greek chorus, commenting on the events of each episode in an allegorical manner. In the spin-off manga, she is the adopted daughter of Reo and Mabu.

The Chief "Otticer" of Science and Technology for the Otter Empire, who describes himself as "an abstract concept". He assumes the physical form of one's inner desires, appearing as Reo to Mabu and Reo, as Kazuki to Enta, and as Chikai to Toi.

Zombies exist in the Field of Desires, a universe parallel to the human world, as the spirits of humans attempting to satisfy their desires from when they were living. Different zombies are fought throughout the series in a villain of the week-style format.

Other characters

Toi's yakuza older brother. His worldview and actions are guided his ardent belief in the survival of the fittest, as demonstrated by his willingness to dispose of anyone he perceives as weak.

Kazuki's younger brother, and fan of Sara Azuma. He uses a wheelchair after getting hit by a car, an incident that Kazuki blames himself for.

Enta's older sister, and teacher to Kazuki and Toi.

Production

Conception
Ikuhara has stated that his chief inspiration behind Sarazanmai was a desire to create a series about kappas. As the majority of stories about yōkai (supernatural monsters) are fables for children, he wished to create a story about yōkai for an adult audience. The more sensationalistic elements of Sarazanmai'''s plot, such as the centrality of shirikodama extraction, were intentionally omitted from the series' pitch to improve the series' chances of being greenlit, with Ikuhara stating that "when you make an original anime, you may come up with some really out-there ideas, but the pitch may not get through. That's why you put in the really wacky stuff after it's already been approved."

Ikuhara has additionally stated that he wished to create a series where the primary protagonists were male, in contrast to the female-centric narratives of his previous directorial efforts. The series setting of Asakusa was chosen for its mixture of historical and contemporary elements.

Development
In August 2017, MAPPA listed a job posting to recruit staff for a "Kunihiko Ikuhara-directed work", effectively announcing the existence of a series to be produced by Ikuhara and the studio. The series was formally announced as Sarazanmai on March 6, 2018 during a three-day Revolutionary Girl Utena marathon on Niconico, with one of three different teaser trailers shown at the end of each respective day of programming. A full-length trailer was released in five parts on Noitamina's YouTube channel, with the first part posted on October 4, 2018, and the final part posted on November 1, 2018.

The eleven-episode series is created by Ikuhara and produced by MAPPA and Lapin Track. The original story is credited to "Ikunirappa" (a portmanteau of "Ikuhara", "Lapin Track", and "MAPPA"), similar to how Ikuhara's previous directorial work Yurikuma Arashi was credited to "Ikunigomamonaka". The primary production staff includes Ikuhara and Teruko Utsumi as script writers, Nobuyuki Takeuchi as chief series director (who previously collaborated with Ikuhara on Utena and Penguindrum); the illustrator Miggy serves as original character designer, while Kayoko Ishikawa adapted the character designs for animation and serves as the chief animation director. The series' closing credits are directed by filmmaker and graphic designer Tao Tajima.

Soundtrack
The series' soundtrack is composed by Yukari Hashimoto. Sarazanmai features two pieces of theme music: Kana-Boon performs the series' opening theme song "Brand-new", while The Peggies perform the series' ending theme song "Stand By Me". Two soundtracks for the series were released by Aniplex: Sarazanmai Music Collection, which collects the series' original score, and Sarazanmai no Uta/Kawausoiya, which collects the series' original songs.

Media
AnimeSarazanmai aired from April 11 to June 20, 2019 on Fuji TV's Noitamina programming block. In English-language markets, Crunchyroll simulcast a subtitled version of the original Japanese version of the series while Funimation simulcast an English-language dubbed version of the series.

Physical media
Aniplex released Sarazanmai across six volumes, in DVD and Blu-ray media formats.

Manga
Sarazanmai: Reo and Mabu
A spin–off manga series,  was published from May 22, 2018 to March 22, 2019. The series was written by Ikuhara (credited as Ikunirappa) with artwork by Misaki Saitō. It was published in Gentosha's manga magazine RuTile on odd-numbered months, and in the online magazine RuTile Sweet on even-numbered months. The complete series was collected into a tankōbon published by Gentosha on March 22, 2019. Seven Seas Entertainment released an English-language translation of the series as Sarazanmai: Reo and Mabu on May 12, 2020.

The manga follows Reo and Mabu after they discover a baby lying in the street on a plate that can only speak the sound "でいっしゅ" ("dish"). They care for her while searching for her parents, giving her the name her Sara (サラ or sara literally meaning "plate" in Japanese). Reo and Mabu encounter various comedic and absurd scenarios throughout the series, many of which are solved by Sara's intervention, who Reo and Mabu come to believe has magical powers. They eventually come to love Sara as their own daughter, and privately hope that her parents will not be discovered. In the penultimate chapter, Sara suddenly grows up into an adult, thanks Reo and Mabu for being her fathers, and disappears with a man who previously sleepwalked into the kōban. Reo and Mabu suddenly both wake up to find Sara still with them as a baby, with an unspecified amount of the events of the manga having merely been a dream.

|}

Sarazanmai Official AnthologySarazanmai Official Anthology, a manga anthology, was published by RuTile on January 30, 2020. The anthology features works from several of Ikuhara's current and former collaborators, including Sarazanmai: Reo and Mabu artist Misaki Saitō; Revolutionary Girl Utena co-creator and Be-Papas member Chiho Saitou; Penguindrum co-creator Lily Hoshino; Yurikuma Arashi co-creator Akiko Morishima; and Nokemono to Hanayome co-creator Asumiko Nakamura. Additional contributors include manga artists Mataaki Off, Samata Techno, Akira Kasukabe, Yamamoto Kotetsuko, Akari Funato, and Riyo. The anthology has also been licensed in English by Seven Seas Entertainment.

Sarazanmai
A manga adaptation of the anime series written by Ikuhara and illustrated by Miggy began serialization on the digital distribution platform Comic Boost on May 19, 2019.

Other media
A two-volume light novel adaptation of Sarazanmai, written by Ikuhara and Utsumi with illustrations by Miggy, was published by Gentosha. The first volume was released on April 16, 2019, and the second volume was released on August 7, 2019. North American licensing rights to the novels were acquired by Seven Seas Entertainment in February 2020, with the first volume slated for release on September 1, 2020.PreZanmai, a radio program hosted by series creator Kunihiko Ikuhara and Keppi voice actor Junichi Suwabe, aired from January 5, 2019 to June 28, 2019. The series was broadcast Saturdays at 9 p.m. online and on A&G Plus in Japan.

A Twitter account, @keeponly1luv, posted daily in-character tweets from Reo and Mabu from November 11, 2018 to March 31, 2019. The account's tweets were deleted on June 13, 2019, following the release of episode 10 of the anime series. A book collecting the tweets was published by Noitamina, and was released at Comiket in August 2019.

A stage play that adapts the anime series, Sara ni Sarazanmai: Ai to Yokubō no Stage (Sarazanmai Once More: A Stage of Love and Desire) was announced on September 12, 2019. The play was directed and written by Naohiro Ise and supervised by Ikuhara, and was staged at Theater 1010 in Tokyo from November 28 to December 1, 2019, and at the Cool Japan Park Osaka in Osaka on December 7 and 8, 2019. Teiko Kagohara, who voiced Sara Azuma in the anime series, reprised her role for the stage play.

Themes and references

The primary theme of Sarazanmai is "connections". Quoting Ikuhara in an interview with Pash! Plus:Similarly to Ikuhara's previous works, the thematic content of Sarazanmai is in direct reference to major world events and systems. Sarazanmai was inspired in part by the 2011 Tōhoku earthquake and tsunami, which informed the series' focus on materialism; in an interview with the Japan Post, Ikuhara stated that the disaster was a lesson in how "material things can be damaged and are not eternal. I have a feeling that young people have a desire to connect with each other instead of a desire for material things." The series' anti-consumerism stance is most overly expressed through the kappa zombies, which revolve around specific objects delivered by "Kappazon", an Amazon analogue.

Consequently, Sarazanmai makes explicit the theme of anti-capitalism, which critic Gabriella Ekens described as having "operated below the surface of Ikuhara's earlier shows, but never quite risen to the level of explicit text". Ekens argues that the series' anti-capitalist message manifests along three major plot elements: Reo and Mabu's subservience to the Otter Empire as an expression of capitalism's selective elevation of people from marginalized groups to positions of authority; Chikai's Faustian bargain with capital to save his family leading to his demise; and Kappazon and the Otter Empire representing capitalism's tendency towards monopolization and exploitation.

The word "Sarazanmai" is derived from the word sara (サラ, "plate"), referring to the plates located on heads of kappas from which they supposedly draw their power, and the suffix -zanmai (ざんまい), referring to indulgence. It is also a close variation of sarasanmai ("three plates"), a reference to the three primary characters who are turned into kappas. The series' setting of Asakusa and Ueno is the location of Kappabashi-dori ("Kitchen Town"), its name a pun for the area's proliferation of kappa imagery and dishware wholesalers.

ReceptionSarazanmai was positively received by critics, and was listed as one of the best series of the spring 2019 anime season by James Beckett and Christopher Farris in Anime News Network's quarterly anime season ratings. In his review of the series for Kotaku, critic Christopher Lee Inoa praised Sarazanmai as Ikuhara’s "most optimistic, streamlined and realistic (yes, really) series to date". Inoa characterizes the series as "a positive step forward for Ikuhara’s career after the messy Yurikuma Arashi," noting that despite Sarazanmai being a shorter series, the production issues and compressed storytelling of Yurikuma Arashi are not present. In their review of the series for Comic Book Resources, critic Reuben Baron 
praised the series' animation, calling it "by far the most impressive Ikuhara-made anime from a strictly animation-based perspective" outside of his 1999 film Adolescence of Utena, and specifically noted its positive portrayal of gay characters.

Reviewing the series for Anime News Network, critic Gabriella Ekens described Sarazanmai as "a fantastic show" but qualified the series as "my least favorite within [Ikuhara's] oeuvre," calling it "his least complex and most technically flawed work". While Ekens praises the series' thematic material, she charges that Sarazanmai'' retreads subjects explored in Ikuhara's previous works, characterizing the series as "repetitious, even more so than Ikuhara's previous output [...] on the highest level of overt text, it's kind of just a pared down version of what's become Ikuni's archetypal narrative."

Notes

References

External links
  
 

2019 anime television series debuts
2010s Japanese LGBT-related television series
Anime with original screenplays
Aniplex franchises
Coming-of-age anime and manga
Cross-dressing in anime and manga
Crunchyroll anime
Fantasy anime and manga
Funimation
Gentosha manga
Japanese LGBT-related animated television series
Josei manga
LGBT speculative fiction television series
MAPPA
LGBT-related comics
Noitamina
Seven Seas Entertainment titles
Works about kappa (folklore)